Glasgow Police Pipe Band is a grade one pipe band from Glasgow, Scotland. Founded in 1883 as the Burgh of Govan Police Pipe Band, the band enjoyed its greatest competitive success as the Strathclyde Police Pipe Band.

History

The band was one of the first civilian bands in Britain when it formed in 1883 as the Burgh of Govan Police Pipe Band. The first pipe major was William Bremer, who was succeeded by Walter Drysdale in 1890, who was in turn succeeded by Alexander Hutcheon in 1898. The band enjoyed a good reputation, and was recognised nationally for its quality. It wore a tartan designed by the Chief Constable, and played two concerts annually to raise funds.

Govan was annexed into Glasgow along with Partick in 1912, and the band became the City of Glasgow Police Pipe Band. In 1913 William Gray, a Gold Medal winner, replaced Hutcheon as pipe major, and the tartan was also replaced with the Royal Stewart. The band won its first World Championship in 1920, but due to Gray's focus on events other than competition the next time the band won the Worlds was 1936.

Gray was succeeded in 1932 by John MacDonald, a student of Gray for many years and also a Gold Medal winner, having won at both the Argyllshire Gathering and the Northern Meeting within a week. Under MacDonald, the band won the World Championships in 1936, 1937, 1938 and 1939, and after the Second World War in 1946, 1949 and 1951.

Angus MacDonald succeeded John MacDonald in 1958, and rebuilt the band after the loss of senior players through retirement had reduced the band's competitiveness. Under Angus MacDonald the band won every major championship except the Worlds.

Ronald Lawrie succeeded Angus MacDonald as pipe major in 1967, but due to ill health Lawrie was succeeded by Ian MacLellan in 1972. In 1975, Strathclyde Police was formed by the merger of several police forces to form the second-largest police force in Britain, and the respective bands were merged into the Strathclyde Police Pipe Band under the leadership of Ian MacLellan.

Under MacLellan and leading drummer Alex Connell the band won the World Championships in 1976 and 1979, being placed second to Dysart and Dundonald in 1977 and 1978. Strathclyde Police then won every year from 1981 to 1986, and then four consecutive times from 1988 to 1991. In 1987, the 78th Fraser Highlanders Pipe Band from Canada became the first band based outside Scotland to win the title, and Simon Fraser University, also from Canada, came second, pushing Strathclyde Police into third place. The run of six consecutive wins remains a record, as does the twenty total wins accumulated throughout the band's history.

MacLellan retired in 1992 and was succeeded by Harry McAleer, who led the band until 1996 when he was succeeded by Ian Plunkett. Plunkett was succeeded by James Wark in 2001, who was in turn succeeded by Donald Mackay in 2004, and Don Bradford became pipe major in 2008 after Mackay stood down.

In 2009, funding cuts and a restriction on the number of events the band could play at threatened the future of the Strathclyde Police Pipe Band. Bradford and pipe-sergeant Duncan Nicholson resigned in protest, but returned in January 2010 after a new funding agreement was reached.

Duncan Nicholson succeeded Bradford in as pipe major in 2010. In 2013, territorial police forces in Scotland were merged into Police Scotland and the name of the band changed to Greater Glasgow Police Scotland Pipe Band, but the structure of the band was unchanged. In 2016, David Henderson replaced Ward as leading drummer, and the name of the band was changed to Glasgow Police Pipe Band.

In December 2019, Iain McPherson stepped down as Pipe Major and Alisdair McLaren was  appointed. McLaren later stepped down in January 2020 due to unforeseen family matters. 
Following McLaren's resignation, Duncan Nicholson, former pipe major, was appointed. Later,  the band announced Ewan Henderson would be appointed Pipe Major with immediate effect, succeeding Duncan Nicholson who stepped in as interim Pipe Major.

Pipe Majors
William Bremer (1883-1890)
Walter Drysdale (1890-1898)
Alexander Hutcheon (1898-1913)
William Gray (1913-1932)
John MacDonald (1932-1958)
Angus MacDonald (1958-1966)
Ronald Lawrie (1966-1972)
Ian MacLellan BEM (1972-1992)Harry McAleer (1992-1997)Ian Plunkett (1997-2001)James Wark (2001-2004)Donald Mackay (2004-2008)Don Bradford (2008-2010)Duncan Nicholson (2010-2015)Iain MacPherson (2015-2019)
  Alisdair MacLaren (2019-2020)Duncan Nicholson (2020)Ewan Henderson (2020–present)

Leading DrummersD/M Walker (1883 - approx. 1910)John Seton (approx. 1910-1927)Jack Seton (1927-1948)Alex McCormick (1948-1952)John Walley (1954-1961)Alex Connell (1961-1985)John Kirkwood Jr. (1985-1992)Roddy Darroch (1992-1995)Eric Ward (1995-2016)David Henderson (2016–present)

Discography
as City of Glasgow Police Pipe BandSelection of Strathspeys and Reels/Eightsome Reels - P/M J. MacDonald (Parlophone F.3355)6/8 Marches - P/M J. MacDonald (Parlophone F.3369)Marching With The Pipers - P/M A. MacDonald (1966)Scottish Pipe Band Music - P/M R. Lawrie (Olympic 6145)The Choice of Champions - P/M R. Lawrie (1968)Scotland's Best, Vol. 1 - P/M R. Lawrie (1970)Scotland's Best, Vol. 3 - P/M R. Lawrie (1971)Glasgow Police March Past (1972)

as Strathclyde Police Pipe BandWorld Champions - P/M I. MacLellan (1980)Champion of Champions (Champions of the World) - P/M I. MacLellan (1983)Six in a Row (1981-1986) - P/M I. MacLellan (1986)Solo Pipers, Quartet and Mini Band (1991)Pipes, Drums & A Glasgow Girl (2006) - with Joann Gilmartin

as Greater Glasgow Police Scotland Pipe BandCeolry'' - P/M D. Nicholson (2015)

References

External links 

 Greater Glasgow Police Scotland Pipe Band

Musical groups established in 1883
Grade 1 pipe bands
Law enforcement in Scotland
World Pipe Band Championships winners
1883 establishments in Scotland
Scottish pipe bands
Police bands